Vertaizon is a commune of the department of Puy-de-Dôme in the region Auvergne-Rhône-Alpes. It is part of the urban area of Clermont-Ferrand.

Geography

Location 
Vertaizon is built on a hill giving a view on the Limagne and Pont-du-Château from its summit, where is situated the ancienne église ("the Ancient church") and the wall from the former castle (destroyed on the orders of Cardinal de Richelieu during the 17th century).

The commune stretches from the foot of the hill to the lieu-dit Chignat.

History 
The foire de Chignat ("fair of Chignat"), former "melons' fair", is one of the oldest fairs in France: its oldest occurrence in documents is from 1303. This event takes place every year at the beginning of September in the field near the Castle of Chignat.

In 1195, the lordship of Vertaizon belonged to the troubadour Pons de Chapteuil, who was eventually attacked by bishop Robert de Clermont, at war with his brother the count Guy II d'Auvergne, a close friend of the lord of the city.

Population

Economy 
The town possess a commercial area and two Adapei (Association Départementale des Amis et Parents de Personnes Handicapées Mentales, "Departmental Association of Friends and Relatives of Mentally Disabled Persons").

Shops 
Eight shops were identified in 2014 : one grocery store, three bakers, one library-newspaper seller, one watchmaker-jeweler and two florists.

Cultural aspects

Landmarks and monuments 
 Ruins of the castle (on a private property)
 Old church "Notre-Dame" from the 13th century

Famous personalities 
 Pons de Chapteuil, troubadour from Auvergne
 Prosper Marilhat, painter
 Xavier Esterre de la Fonseca, professional football player

See also
Communes of the Puy-de-Dôme department

References

Communes of Puy-de-Dôme